In mathematics, osculate, meaning to touch (from the Latin osculum meaning kiss), may refer to:

osculant, an invariant of hypersurfaces
osculating circle
osculating curve
osculating plane
osculating orbit

The obsolete Quinarian system of biological classification attempted to group creatures into circles which could touch or overlap with adjacent circles, a phenomenon called 'osculation'.